Crosskeys railway station is a station serving the village of Crosskeys in the Caerphilly County Borough in Wales. It is on the Ebbw Valley Railway.

The station is situated near the former station site closed in 1962, behind houses on Risca Road and Carlton Terrace. The access to the station is via a one-way system off High Street exiting via Carlton Terrace.

Crosskeys is a two-platform station and there is no car park.  The station provides good access to the village and Crosskeys College.

The station marks the end of the double-track passing loop between Risca and Crosskeys; upon leaving Crosskeys trains enter the single track which extends to the railhead in Ebbw Vale Town.

History
The station opened on 7 June 2008, four months after services recommenced on the line.

Services
On Sundays, the hourly Cardiff to Ebbw Vale service runs via Newport.

References

External links 

 Planning Approval Granted for New Railway Station
Archive of Ebbw Valley Railway Scheme website (Blaenau Gwent council, 2008)

Railway stations in Caerphilly County Borough
DfT Category F2 stations
Railway stations opened by Network Rail
Railway stations in Great Britain opened in 2008
Railway stations served by Transport for Wales Rail